The Jockey Club of Canada was formed in 1973 to oversee thoroughbred horse racing in Canada. Based in Toronto, Ontario, the club is responsible for the annual Sovereign Awards program and the Canadian Graded Stakes Committee.

Founding members:
 Colonel Charles "Bud" Baker 
 Douglas Banks 
 Warren Beasley 
 Richard A. N. Bonnycastle
 Charles F. W. Burns
 Arthur B. Christopher
 Harry J. Carmichael 
 George C. Frostad 
 George R. Gardiner 
 W. Preston Gilbride 
 Caryl Nicholas Charles Hardinge, 4th Viscount Hardinge
 George C. Hendrie 
 Charles John "Jack" Jackson
 Sydney J. "Jim" Langill
 Richard R. Kennedy 
 Jean-Louis Levesque 
 Frank M. McMahon
 John Angus "Bud" McDougald 
 J. E. Frowde Seagram 
 Frank H. Sherman 
 Conn Smythe 
 E. P. Taylor 
 Donald G. "Bud" Willmot

Canadian Graded Stakes Committee
Each year, the Club's Canadian Graded Stakes Committee meets to review open Thoroughbred horse races. To be eligible for graded stakes race status, a race must offer a minimum purse in an amount determined by the Committee. As at 2008, there are thirty-seven Canadian graded stakes races of which all but five are run at Toronto's Woodbine Racetrack.

External links
 The Jockey Club of Canada official website

Horse racing organizations
1973 establishments in Canada
Horse racing organizations in Canada
Sports organizations established in 1973